Pushkarasarin or Pukkusati was a king of the Iron Age Indo-Aryan kingdom of Gandhāra during the 6th century BCE.

Reign
Pukkusāti became king of Gandhāra at a time when this state was an important imperial power in north-west Iron Age South Asia, with the other states of the Punjab region, such as the Kekayas, Madras, Uśīnaras, and Shivis being under the suzerainty of Gandhāra.

Pukkusāti engaged in expansionist ventures which brought him into conflict with the king Pradyota of the rising power of Avanti. Pukkusāti was successful in this struggle with Pradyota, but war broke out between him and the Pāṇḍava tribe located in the Punjab region, and who were threatened by his expansionist policy. Pukkusāti also engaged in friendly relations with the king Bimbisāra of Magadha, who married Kṣemā, the daughter of the king of Madra, who was a vassal of Pukkusāti.

By the later 6th century BCE, the founder of the Persian Achaemenid Empire, Cyrus, soon after his conquests of Media, Lydia, and Babylonia, marched into Gandhara and annexed it into his empire. The scholar Kaikhosru Danjibuoy Sethna advanced that Cyrus had conquered only the trans-Indus borderlands around Peshawar which had belonged to Gandhāra while Pukkusāti remained a powerful king who maintained his rule over the rest of Gandhāra and the western Punjab.

However, according to the scholar Buddha Prakash, Pukkusāti might have acted as a bulwark against the expansion of the Persian Achaemenid Empire into north-west South Asia. This hypothesis posits that the army which Nearchus claimed Cyrus had lost in Gedrosia had in fact been defeated by Pukkusāti's Gāndhārī kingdom.

It is unknown whether Pukkusāti remained in power after the Achaemenid conquest as a Persian vassal or if he was replaced by a Persian satrap (governor), although Buddhist sources claim that he renounced his throne and became a monk after becoming a disciple of the Buddha.

References

Citations

Sources
 

6th-century BC Indian monarchs